Lakebay is an unincorporated community in Pierce County, Washington, United States. Lakebay has a post office with ZIP code 98349.

The community derives its name from nearby Bay Lake.

References

External links

Unincorporated communities in Pierce County, Washington
Unincorporated communities in Washington (state)